Antônio Moreira da Silva (1 April 1902, in Rio de Janeiro – 6 June 2000, in Rio de Janeiro) was a very reputed Brazilian singer and songwriter of Samba, also known by his nickname Kid Morengueira.

He was the older son of Bernardino de Sousa Paranhos, trombone player for the Rio de Janeiro Military Police (PMERJ), and Miss Pauladina de Assis Moreira.

Born in Rio de Janeiro, in the Morro do Salgueiro district, he only began to study at nine years-old, but soon left school in favor of music (after the death of his father).

During his career, at the same time when he seriously started performing, songwriting and singing, he worked as factory employee, cab driver and ambulance driver.

Widely reputed as the creator of the samba-de-breque (brake-Samba), Moreira da Silva started his artistic career in 1931, with Ererê & Rei da Umbanda (Êrere and King of Umbanda). In the 1992 Rio de Janeiro carnival, was elected to be the theme of the Unidos de Manguinhos samba school parading. In 1995, at the age of 93 years, he recorded the acclaimed "Os 3 Malandros in Concert" album, with two other famous Samba songwriters and singers: Dicró and Bezerra da Silva.

Even in his last years, Moreira da Silva continued to perform with some regularity on live shows and recording seasons.

Moreira da Silva died in 2000, at the age of 98 years, in the city of Rio de Janeiro.

Some albums 

This is not an exhaustive list of recorded albums and needs complementation with more albums and singles.

 Implorar ("To Beg") - 1935
 Jogo Proibido ("Forbidden Game") - 1937
 Acertei no Milhar ("I Hit in the Lottery") - 1940
 Amigo Urso ("Friend Bear")
 Fui à Paris ("I Gone to Paris")
 Na Subida do Morro ("Uphill in the Favela")
 O Rei do Gatilho ("Trigger King") - 1962
 O Último dos Moicanos ("The Last of the Mohicans") - 1963

References 

1902 births
2000 deaths
20th-century Brazilian male singers
20th-century Brazilian singers